Christopher Robert Zorich (born March 16, 1969) is a former American football defensive tackle who played in college for the Notre Dame Fighting Irish and in the National Football League (NFL) for the Chicago Bears and Washington Redskins. Zorich was the athletic director at Chicago State University from May 2018 to July 2019.

Early life
An only child of African American and Croatian descent, Zorich was raised by his mother, Zora (1931 - 1991, buried at Saint Mary Catholic Cemetery, Illinois), on the South Side of Chicago, where he attended Chicago Vocational High School. Chris is nephew to character actor Louis Zorich and nephew-in-law to Olympia Dukakis.

College career
Zorich received a scholarship to play college football at the University of Notre Dame in 1987 and began as a linebacker but was moved to nose tackle early in the season and did not play.  However, Zorich then earned All-American honors the following season. In his first game, he had one and a half sacks and ten tackles against the University of Michigan and finished the year third on the team in tackles as Notre Dame went undefeated and won the national championship.

During his junior year, he followed his initial season with a consensus All-America year in 1989 and was also one of four finalists for the Lombardi Award. Also in 1989 he was voted the UPI Lineman of the Year award as the top lineman in college football. As a senior, Zorich won the Lombardi Award and was recognized as a unanimous All-America.

In the final game of his college career he was the Defensive Most Valuable player of the 1991 Orange Bowl.

While at Notre Dame, Zorich attended a class taught by now Big Ten Commissioner Kevin Warren. Zorich eventually signed with Warren's new law firm as Warren's first client.

NFL career
Zorich was drafted in the second round of the 1991 NFL Draft by the Chicago Bears. He played for the Bears from 1991 until 1997, and he was named an alternate for the 1993 Pro Bowl. On December 27, 1992, he returned a fumble for a touchdown during a 27-14 loss to the Dallas Cowboys. He also played one season (1997) for the Washington Redskins. In his NFL career, Zorich tallied 16.5 career quarterback sacks and scored total one touchdown.

After football
Zorich earned a Juris Doctor (J.D.) degree at Notre Dame and established the Christopher Zorich Foundation in 1993 to assist disadvantaged families. He is a past recipient of USA WEEKEND's Most Caring Athlete Award and the Jesse Owens Foundation Humanitarian Award. Zorich has also worked as a motivational speaker.

On May 9, 2007, Zorich was announced as one of the specially selected inductees of the 2007 class at the College Football Hall of Fame.  Not only was he one of the youngest players to ever be inducted, he is only the third defensive lineman from tradition-rich Notre Dame to call the College Football Hall of Fame home.

On December 8, 2009, Zorich was also inducted into the FedEx Orange Bowl Hall of Fame for his outstanding performances in back-to-back Orange Bowl appearances (1990 and 1991).

Zorich lives in Chicago and continues to be an active member of the community. From 2015 to 2018, he served as the athletic director at Prairie State College, a community college in Chicago Heights, Ill. In May 2018, he was named the athletic director at Chicago State University. On July 30, 2019, Zorich and the university parted ways after 14 months on the job. It was unclear if Zorich was fired or if he announced his resignation.

References

External links
 
 

1969 births
Living people
African-American players of American football
All-American college football players
American football defensive tackles
American motivational speakers
American people of Croatian descent
Philanthropists from Illinois
Chicago Bears players
Chicago State Cougars athletic directors
Chicago Vocational High School alumni
College Football Hall of Fame inductees
Notre Dame Fighting Irish football players
Notre Dame Law School alumni
Sportspeople from Chicago
Players of American football from Chicago
Washington Redskins players
21st-century African-American people
20th-century African-American sportspeople
Brian Piccolo Award winners